Events from the year 1964 in Taiwan, Republic of China. This year is numbered Minguo 53 according to the official Republic of China calendar.

Incumbents
 President – Chiang Kai-shek
 Vice President – Chen Cheng
 Premier – Yen Chia-kan
 Vice Premier – Yu Ching-tang

Events

January
 18 January – The 6.3  Baihe earthquake occurred in Tainan County.

March
 1 March – The founding of Free China Weekly.

July
 1 July – The establishment of Yunlin District Prosecutors Office in Yunlin County.

August
 3 August – The opening of Taipei City Council new venue at the corner of Zhongxiao West Road and Zhongshan South Road from the former Zhongshan Hall.

October
 25 October – The founding of Taiwan Daily.

Births
 1 January – Chang Li-shan, Magistrate of Yunlin County.
 13 February – Lin Chia-lung, Mayor of Taichung (2014–2018).
 30 July – Chiang Shu-na, singer, television presenter and actress.
 20 December – Carl Chien, Co-Head of Banking for JPMorgan Greater China.
 23 December – Chen Chi-mai, Deputy Secretary-General of the Presidential Office (2007–2008).

Deaths
 10 November – Yu Youren, President of Control Yuan (1930-1964).

References

 
Years of the 20th century in Taiwan